Ferdinand August Geiger (October 15, 1867 – July 31, 1939) was a United States district judge of the United States District Court for the Eastern District of Wisconsin.

Education and career

Born in Cassville, Wisconsin, Geiger was in private practice in Milwaukee, Wisconsin from 1888 to 1912.

Federal judicial service

On February 19, 1912, Geiger was nominated by President William Howard Taft to a seat on the United States District Court for the Eastern District of Wisconsin vacated by Judge Joseph V. Quarles. Geiger was confirmed by the United States Senate on March 20, 1912, and received his commission the same day. Geiger served in that capacity until his retirement on May 22, 1939 due to poor health. He died on July 31, 1939, and was buried in Cassville.

References

Sources
 

1867 births
1939 deaths
People from Cassville, Wisconsin
Judges of the United States District Court for the Eastern District of Wisconsin
United States district court judges appointed by William Howard Taft
20th-century American judges